Finchley Central  may refer to:

 Finchley Central tube station
 Finchley Central (game), mind game
 Church End, Finchley, also known as Finchley Central
 A song by The New Vaudeville Band